Pungtungia herzi is a species of cyprinid fish found in Japan and the Korean Peninsula.

Named in honor of German entomologist Alfred Otto Herz (1856-1905), who collected the type specimen.

See also
Brood parasite

References

Pungtungia
Taxa named by Solomon Herzenstein
Fish described in 1892
Brood parasites